Alexis Chassang (2 April 1827 in Bourg-la-Reine – 8 March 1888 in Bourg-la-Reine) was a French linguist and translator.

In 1849 he received his agrégation in letters, and in 1852, his doctorate. Afterwards, he served as a professor of rhetoric at lycées in Lille and Bourges. From 1862 to 1871 he was a professor of Greek languages and literature at the École Normale Supérieure in Paris.

From 1873 to 1888 he held the post of Inspector General of Secondary Education. He was co-founder of the Association pour l'encouragement des études grecques (Association for the Promotion of Hellenic Studies), serving as its president in 1887.

Published works 
 Des Essais dramatiques imités de l'antiquité au XIVe et au XVe siècle, 1852 (dissertation).
 Choix de narrations tirées des auteurs latins, 1854.
 Histoire du roman et de ses rapports avec l'histoire dans l'antiquité grecque et latine, 1862.
 Apollonius de Tyane : sa vie, ses voyages, ses prodiges, 1862 (translation of Philostratus).
 Le Spiritualisme et l'idéal dans l'art et la poésie des Grecs, 1868.
 Nouveau dictionnaire grec-francais, 1872.
 Nouvelle grammaire grecque... d'après les principes de la grammaire comparée, 1872.
 Nouvelle grammaire française, 1876.
 Grammaire grecque, d'après la méthode comparative et historique : cours supérieur, 1888.
 New etymological French grammar giving for the first time the history of the French syntax.

References
 Pierre Larousse, Grand Dictionnaire universel du XIXe siècle, vol. III, 1867.

External links
 

1827 births
1888 deaths
19th-century French writers
École Normale Supérieure alumni
Academic staff of the École Normale Supérieure
French hellenists
French lexicographers
People from Bourg-la-Reine
19th-century French translators
19th-century French male writers
French male non-fiction writers
19th-century lexicographers